Wilfred Judson,  (July 20, 1902 – June 15, 1980) was a Canadian lawyer and Puisne Justice of the Supreme Court of Canada.

Born in Todmorden, England, the son of John and Agnes Judson, he received a BA in 1922 and an MA in 1923 from the University of Manchester. In 1923 he emigrated to Canada. He graduated from Osgoode Hall Law School and was called to the bar in 1932. After practising law for 19 years he was appointed to the High Court of Justice of Ontario in 1951 and to the Supreme Court of Canada in 1958. He retired in 1977.

In 1978, he was made a Companion of the Order of Canada.

References
 Supreme Court of Canada biography

Justices of the Supreme Court of Canada
Companions of the Order of Canada
1902 births
1980 deaths
People from Todmorden
Alumni of the University of Manchester
Canadian King's Counsel
Judges in Ontario
English emigrants to Canada
Osgoode Hall Law School alumni
Lawyers in Ontario